Affari Esteri is an Italian journal on foreign affairs. Published quarterly in Rome, it has the support of the Italian Ministry of Foreign Affairs. 

The review was founded in 1969 by ASPE - Associazione Italiana per gli Studi di Politica Estera (Italian Association for Foreign Policy Studies).

See also
 List of magazines in Italy

References

External links
Italian Ministry of Foreign Affairs review of Affari Esteri

1969 establishments in Italy
International relations journals
Italian-language magazines
Political magazines published in Italy
Magazines established in 1969
Magazines published in Rome
Quarterly magazines published in Italy